Sun Lakes may refer to places in the United States:

 Sun Lakes, Arizona
 Sun Lakes-Dry Falls State Park in Washington
 Sun Lakes Park Resort in Washington